Asca plantaria is a species of mite in the family Ascidae.

References

Further reading

 

plantaria
Articles created by Qbugbot
Animals described in 1996